Pauloosie Jamesie Akeeagok, commonly, and officially known, as P.J. Akeeagok  (born November 5, 1984), is a Canadian Inuk politician who in 2021 became the sixth and current premier of Nunavut. He was elected a member of the Legislative Assembly of Nunavut in the 2021 Nunavut general election. He represents the electoral district of Iqaluit-Niaqunnguu.

Prior to his election to the legislature, he was president of the Qikiqtani Inuit Association, resigning from that position in August 2021 in preparation for the election campaign.

Background
Akeeagok was born on November 5, 1984 and raised in Grise Fiord.

Political career
Akeeagok was elected to the Legislative Assembly in the territorial election in 2021. He was selected to become premier in the Nunavut Leadership Forum on November 17, 2021, and defeated incumbent premier Joe Savikataaq.

References

Living people
Premiers of Nunavut
Members of the Legislative Assembly of Nunavut
Inuit politicians
21st-century Canadian politicians
Inuit from Nunavut
People from Iqaluit
1984 births